Pine Hill Station is a pastoral lease that operates as a cattle station on the lower Barkly Tableland in the Northern Territory of Australia.

Location

History
In 2019, the property was acquired by David and Suzanne Bassingthwaighte from Queensland from Filipino banker and property developer Romeo Roxas, who sold Pine Hill Station at around the same time. The  property was stocked with approximately 7,400 head of droughtmaster-cross cattle and had been listed at 16 million.

The Aboriginal Alyawarre peoples are the traditional owners of the area, having inhabited the area for tens of thousands of years. Europeans arrived in the area in the 1890s using the plains beside the river for cattle grazing.

See also
List of ranches and stations

References

Stations (Australian agriculture)
Pastoral leases in the Northern Territory